Urbinasopen is a village located in the eastern part of the island Waigeo east, Indonesia, the Capital District of the four villages namely Puper Urbinasopen, Yembekaki, and Yessener. This area has a population of more than 400 people with the majority working as fisherman or working in the fields. The village has a large dock, which does not operate every day because there is no land to go every perkampungannya. Urbinasopen transportation to use the sea route with a wooden boat which is often called the longboat, can be of the sliding track as well as from the district capital Waisai. As for its natural attractions is quite interesting, every end of December there is a sea ghost phenomenon which is said is one of the phenomena of the traditions of their ancestors.

References

Populated places in Raja Ampat